Lijingpu Subdistrict is a rural subdistrict in Ningxiang City, Hunan Province, China.

Administrative division
The Subdistrict is divided into seven villages and one community: Jinnan Community, Ziyun Village, Jingtuan Village, Qunxing Village, Dawanling Village, Lijingpu Village, Nantaihu Village and Xinbaota Village.

Geography
The Wu River, a tributary of the Wei River, it flows through the town.

Economy
The region abounds with iron.

Grape is important to the economy.

Culture
Huaguxi is the most influentially form of local theater.

Transportation
The 319 National Highway continues into Yiyang City, linking Lijingpu Subdistrict to Yutan Subdistrict, Chengjiao Subdistrict and Jinghuapu Township.

Celebrity
Tao Shiyue, general.

References

External links

Subdistricts of Ningxiang